Aska Lok Sabha constituency is one of the 21 Lok Sabha (parliamentary) constituencies in Odisha state in eastern India.

Assembly segments
Presently, after the delimitation of parliamentary constituencies in 2008, the following 7 Legislative Assembly segments constitute Aska Lok Sabha constituency:

Members of Parliament

Election Results

2019 Election Result

2014 Election Result
In 2014 election, Biju Janata Dal candidate Ladu Kishore Swain defeated Indian National Congress candidate Srilokanath Rath by a margin of 3,11,997 votes.

General Election 2009

Notes

References

Lok Sabha constituencies in Odisha
Politics of Ganjam district